A priestess is a female priest, a woman having the authority or power to administer religious rites.

Priestess may also refer to:
 Priestess (album), an album by Gil Evans
 Priestess (band), a Canadian hard rock band
 Priestess (rapper), an Italian rapper
 The Priestess, an Armenian film
 The High Priestess, a Major Arcana Tarot card